KX Television, sometimes branded as KX Net or simply KX, is a group of four television stations in western North Dakota owned by the Nexstar Media Group and affiliated with CBS and The CW.

Stations
The network consists of four stations:

The group was formed in 1958 when John Boler, owner of KBMB-TV in Bismarck (founded in 1955), sold a half-interest in his station to Minot businessman Chester Reiten.  Boler and Reiten then teamed up to buy North Dakota's oldest station, KCJB-TV in Minot (founded in 1953), and changed its call letters to KXMC-TV.  The two stations formed a mini-network, with KXMC as the flagship station even though KBMB was the larger station.  A year later, KBMB changed its calls to KXMB.

KXMD in Williston signed on in 1969.  Two years later, Boler sold his stake in the stations to Reiten.  

The network was partially completed in 1970, when KDIX-TV in Dickinson began switching to and from KXMB's signal whenever CBS programming aired, as KDIX-TV could not afford a network feed.  This arrangement continued after KDIX-TV was sold to new owners and changed its call letters to KNDX. When KNDX was on the verge of closure in late 1984, Reiten bought the station, changed its calls to KXMA, and merged it fully into the KX network.  

The stations carried a secondary affiliation with ABC until KBMY signed on in 1985.

Chester Reiten retired in the 1990s and turned over his interest in the stations to his five children: Steve Reiten, David Reiten, Kathleen Reiten Hruby, Tim Reiten, and Melanie Reiten Shonkwiler.  Master control and internal operations were moved to Bismarck sometime in the 2000s. David Reiten served as KXMC's general manager. Tim Reiten served as company president and KXMB's general manager. 

KXMB and KXMC are the two full-fledged stations in the group.  KXMB covers the southern portion of the market while KXMC covers the northern portion. For many years, KXMA placed local inserts into KXMB's newscasts, while KXMD placed inserts into KXMC's newscasts. However, recent cutbacks have resulted in all operations being merged in Bismarck and Minot, with KXMA and KXMD being reduced to local bureaus, and as a result, local inserts have been eliminated. However, all four stations continue to air separate identifications and commercials.  Starting in 2009, KXMA and KXMD began simulcasting KBMY on their digital subcarriers as part of a sales agreement with KBMY's owner, Forum Communications.  

Nexstar Broadcasting Group announced that it would merge with Reiten Television in a $44 million deal on September 17, 2015–a handsome return on Chester Reiten's original investment in KXMB-TV 57 years earlier. The sale was completed on February 2, 2016. As result of the acquisition, Nexstar terminated KX Television's agreements with KBMY.

Nexstar signed an affiliation deal with The CW on July 1, 2016, bringing the network to the KX stations.  The CW programming airs on the second digital channels of KXMB, KXMC, and KXMD.  However, it airs on KXMA's primary channel in an unusual arrangement, moving CBS to the second channel.  This is likely to ensure satellite carriage for The CW Plus in the market, as satellite providers do not usually carry secondary subchannel services.

For years, the stations used the slogan Your Eye on Dakota, an allusion to the CBS Eyemark logo. Around 2020, the branding changed to Putting North Dakota First.

References

External links

CBS network affiliates
Television stations in North Dakota
The CW affiliates
Nexstar Media Group